List of rulers of the Akan (Bron) state of Akwamu (formerly Twifo-Heman)

Territory comprised part of present-day southern Ghana

See also
Akan people
Ghana
Gold Coast
Lists of office-holders

Rulers
Lists of African rulers